The University of Queensland (UQ, or Queensland University) is a public research university located primarily in Brisbane, the capital city of the Australian state of Queensland. Founded in 1909 by the Queensland parliament, UQ is one of the six sandstone universities, an informal designation of the oldest university in each state. In combination of the three most established global universities rankings in 2023, the University of Queensland is ranked as 2nd in Australia and 42nd in the world. Also, UQ is a founding member of edX, Australia's leading Group of Eight and the international research-intensive Association of Pacific Rim Universities.

The main St Lucia campus occupies much of the riverside inner suburb of St Lucia, southwest of the Brisbane central business district. Other UQ campuses and facilities are located throughout Queensland, the largest of which are the Gatton campus and the Mayne Medical School. UQ's overseas establishments include UQ North America office in Washington D.C., and the UQ-Ochsner Clinical School in Louisiana, United States.

The university offers associate, bachelor, master, doctoral, and higher doctorate degrees through a college, a graduate school, and six faculties. UQ incorporates over one hundred research institutes and centres offering research programs, such as the Institute for Molecular Bioscience, Boeing Research and Technology Australia Centre, the Australian Institute for Bioengineering and Nanotechnology, and the UQ Dow Centre for Sustainable Engineering Innovation. Recent notable research of the university include pioneering the invention of the HPV vaccine that prevents cervical cancer, developing a COVID-19 vaccine that was in human trials, and the development of high-performance superconducting MRI magnets for portable scanning of human limbs.

UQ counts two Nobel laureates (Peter C. Doherty and John Harsanyi), over a hundred Olympians winning numerous gold medals, and 117 Rhodes Scholars among its alumni and former staff. UQ's alumni also include University of California, San Francisco Chancellor Sam Hawgood, the first female Governor-General of Australia Dame Quentin Bryce, former President of King's College London Ed Byrne, member of United Kingdom's Prime Minister Council for Science and Technology Max Lu, Oscar and Emmy awards winner Geoffrey Rush, triple Grammy Award winner Tim Munro, former CEO and Chairman of Dow Chemical Andrew N. Liveris, and current director of multiple organisations including IBM.

History

Foundation of the university

According to the Queensland Government's Heritage Register's History section:
Proposals for a university in Queensland began in the 1870s. A Royal Commission in 1874, chaired by Sir Charles Lilley, recommended the immediate establishment of a university. Those against a university argued that technical rather than academic education was more important in an economy dominated by primary industry. Those in favour of the university, in the face of this opposition, distanced themselves from Oxford and Cambridge and proposed instead a model derived from the mid-western states of the U.S.A. A second Royal Commission in 1891 recommended the inclusion of five faculties in a new university; Arts, Law, Medicine, Science, and Applied Science. Education generally was given a low priority in Queensland's budgets, and in a colony with a literacy rate of 57% in 1861, primary education was the first concern well ahead of secondary and technical education. The government, despite the findings of the Royal Commissions, was unwilling to commit funds to the establishment of a university.

In 1893, the Queensland University Extension Movement was begun by a group of private individuals who organised public lecture courses in adult education, hoping to excite wider community support for a university in Queensland. In 1894, 245 students were enrolled in the extension classes and the lectures were described as practical and useful. In 1906 the University Extension Movement staged the University Congress, a forum for interested delegates to promote the idea of a university. Opinion was mobilised, a fund was started and a draft Bill for a Queensland University was prepared. Stress was laid on the practical aspects of university education and its importance for the commerce of Queensland. The proceedings of the Congress were forwarded to Premier [of Queensland] Kidston. In October 1906, sixty acres in Victoria Park were gazetted for university purposes.

The University of Queensland was established by an Act of State Parliament on 10 December 1909 to commemorate the 50th anniversary of Queensland's separation from the colony of New South Wales. The Act allowed for the university to be governed by a senate of 20 men and Sir William MacGregor, the incoming Governor, was appointed the first chancellor with RH Roe as the vice-chancellor. Old Government House ... [then Government House] in George Street was set aside for the university following the departure of the governor to the Bardon residence, Fernberg..., sparking the first debates about the best location for the university.

In 1910 the first teaching faculties were created. These included Engineering, Classics, Mathematics[,] and Chemistry. In December of the same year, the Senate appointed the first four professors; BD Steele in chemistry, JL Michie in classics, H. Priestley in mathematics and A Gibson in engineering. In 1911 the first students enrolled.
The university's first classes in the Government House were held in 1911 with 83 commencing students and Sir William MacGregor is the first chancellor (with RH Roe as vice-chancellor). The University of Queensland began to award degrees to its first group of graduating students in 1914.

1920s to 1990s

The development of the university was delayed by World War I, but after the first world war the university enrolments for education and research took flight as demand for higher education increased in Australia. Thus, in the early 1920s the growing university had to look for a more spacious campus as its original site in George Street, Brisbane, had limited room for expansion. In 1927, James O'Neil Mayne and his sister, Mary, provided a grant of approximately £50,000 to the Brisbane City Council to acquire  of land in St Lucia and provided it to the University of Queensland as its permanent home. In the same year, the pitch drop experiment was started by Thomas Parnell. The experiment has been described as the world's oldest and continues to this day. Lack of finance delayed development of the St Lucia campus. Hence, the construction of the university's first building in St Lucia only began in 1938. It was later named the Forgan Smith Building, after the premier of the day and it was completed in 1939. During World War II, the Forgan Smith Building was used as a military base and it served first as advanced headquarters for the Allied Land Forces in the South West Pacific.

The first Doctor of Science was awarded in 1942. The first PhD was awarded in 1952.

1990s to present day

In 1990, Australia reorganised its higher education system by abolishing the binary system of universities and colleges of advanced education. Under this transition, the university merged with Queensland Agricultural College, to establish the new UQ Gatton campus. In 1999, UQ Ipswich began operation as one of the completely Web-enabled campuses in Australia.

In 2010, The University of Queensland was a recipient of the Queensland Greats Awards.

In May 2013, UQ joined edX, an international consortium of massive open online courses (MOOCs). From May 2014, the initial four UQx courses cover hypersonics, tropical coastal ecosystems, biomedical imaging and the science of everyday thinking.

Organisation and administration

The University of Queensland is organised into a number of divisions for academic, administrative and logistical purposes.

Governance
The senate is the governing body of The University of Queensland and consists of 22 members from the university and community. The senate is led by the chancellor and deputy chancellor, elected by the senate. The University of Queensland Act 1998 grants the senate wide powers to appoint staff, manage and control university affairs and property and manage and control finances to promote the university's interests.

 Vice-Chancellor and President
 Provost
 Deputy Vice-Chancellor (Academic)
 Deputy Vice-Chancellor (External Engagement)
 Deputy Vice-Chancellor (Research)
 Pro-Vice-Chancellor
 Pro-Vice-Chancellor (Advancement)
 Pro-Vice-Chancellor (Indigenous Engagement)
 Pro-Vice-Chancellor (Research)
 Pro-Vice-Chancellor (Research Infrastructure)
 Pro-Vice-Chancellor (Research Training)
 Pro-Vice-Chancellor (Teaching and Learning)
 Chief Operating Officer
 President of the Academic Board

The academic board is the university's senior academic advisory body. It formulates policy on academic matters including new programs, teaching, learning and assessment, research, promotions, student academic matters, prizes and scholarships. An academic board member is elected annually as its president. The president is assisted by a half-time deputy president.

Academic faculties
The university has six faculties to support both research and teaching activities.

Faculty of Business, Economics and Law
 School of Business
 School of Economics
 School of Law

Faculty of Engineering, Architecture and Information Technology
 School of Architecture
 School of Chemical Engineering
 School of Civil Engineering
 School of Information Technology and Electrical Engineering
 School of Mechanical and Mining Engineering

Faculty of Health and Behavioural Sciences
 School of Dentistry
 School of Health and Rehabilitation Sciences
 School of Human Movement and Nutrition Sciences
 School of Nursing, Midwifery and Social Work
 School of Pharmacy
 School of Psychology

Faculty of Humanities and Social Sciences
 School of Communication and Arts
 School of Education
 School of Historical and Philosophical Inquiry
 School of Languages and Cultures
 School of Music
 School of Political Science and International Studies
 School of Social Science

Faculty of Medicine
 School of Biomedical Sciences
 School of Public Health

Faculty of Science
 School of Agriculture and Food Sciences
 School of Biological Sciences
 School of Chemistry and Molecular Biosciences
 School of Earth and Environmental Sciences
 School of Mathematics and Physics
 School of Veterinary Science

UQ has a semester-based modular system for conducting academic courses. The Australian higher education model features a combination of the British system, such as small group teaching (tutorials) and the American system (course credits).

Finances
Over a decade, UQ received more than $200 million in additional revenue from billionaire Chuck Feeney’s Atlantic Philanthropies, which matched funding with the Beattie government’s Smart State program.

Academic profile

Rankings

Some of UQ's rankings are 36th in the world by the 2022 U.S. News, 47th in the world in the Academic Ranking of World Universities 2022, 50th in the world in the 2023 QS World University Rankings, 53rd in the world in the Times Higher Education World University Rankings 2023, 37th in the world in the CWTS Leiden Ranking 2022,  and UQ is ranked 33rd in the world in the 2022 NTU rankings.  

The University of Queensland is currently Australia's second best university and is ranked 42 globally on average. As per 2023, UQ ranks as second best university in Australia and 42 in the world on average. These rankings are given by the Aggregate Rankings of Top Universities (UNSW) which finds the average of all major ranking organisations (like QS, THE, ARWU) and positions them in the list. 

Subject

Overall, UQ Business School's Master of Business Administration degree is ranked first in Asia Pacific and top 10 globally in The Economist Intelligence Unit 2016 MBA ranking. UQ's MBA degree is ranked 1st in Australia by the Australian Financial Review. UQ is also the top Australasian institution for life sciences in the U.S. News & World Report and the Academic Ranking of World Universities.

The university is also highly ranked in various engineering disciplines. In mining and minerals engineering, it stands in 3rd worldwide, in chemical engineering 76–100th worldwide, in civil engineering 76–100th worldwide, in material science and engineering 101–150th worldwide, and in electrical and electronic engineering it is ranked within 101–150th worldwide.

In the Center for World University Rankings (CWUR) inaugural world subject rankings, UQ ranked first in Biodiversity Conservation, and top 10 in 13 subjects based on the numbers of research articles published in top-tier journals.

In the QS World University Rankings by Subject 2021, UQ ranked in the top 50 in the world in 20 subjects,. UQ is first in Australia, second in the world, for Sports-Related Subjects, and second in Australia, third in world, for Mineral & Mining Engineering .Research
Queensland has a strong research focus in science, medicine and technology. The university's research advancement includes pioneering the development of the cervical cancer vaccines, Gardasil and Cervarix, by UQ Professor Ian Frazer.
In 2009, the Australian Cancer Research Foundation reported that UQ had taken the lead in numerous areas of cancer research.

In the Commonwealth Government's Excellence in Research for Australia 2012 National Report, UQ's research is rated above world standard in more broad fields than at any other Australian university (in 22 broad fields), and more UQ researchers are working in research fields that ERA has assessed as above world standard than at any other Australian university. UQ research in biomedical and clinical health sciences, technology, engineering, biological sciences, chemical sciences, environmental sciences, and physical sciences was ranked above world standard (rating 5).

In 2015, UQ is ranked by Nature Index as the research institution with the highest volume of research output in both interdisciplinary journals Nature and Science within the southern hemisphere, with approximately twofold more output than the global average.

In 2020 Clarivate named 34 UQ professors to its list of Highly Cited Researchers.

Aside from disciplinary-focused teaching and research within the academic faculties, the university maintains a number of interdisciplinary research institutes and centres at the national, state and university levels. For example, the Asia-Pacific Centre for the Responsibility to Protect, the University of Queensland Seismology Station, Heron Island Research Station and the Institute of Modern Languages.

With the support from the Queensland Government, the Australian Government and major donor The Atlantic Philanthropies, The University of Queensland dedicates basic, translational and applied research via the following research-focused institutes:
 Institute for Molecular Bioscience – within the Queensland Bioscience Precinct which houses scientists from the Commonwealth Scientific and Industrial Research Organisation and the Community for Open Antimicrobial Drug Discovery

 Translational Research Institute, which houses The University of Queensland's Diamantina Institute, School of Medicine and the Mater Medical Research Institute
 Australian Institute for Bioengineering and Nanotechnology
 Institute for Social Science Research
 Sustainable Minerals Institute
 Global Change Institute
Queensland Alliance for Environmental Health Science
 Queensland Alliance for Agriculture and Food Innovation
 Queensland Brain Institute
 Centre for Advanced Imaging
 Boeing Research and Technology Australia Centre
 UQ Dow Centre

The University of Queensland plays a key role in Brisbane Diamantina Health Partners, Queensland's first academic health science system. This partnership currently comprises Children's Health Queensland, Mater Health Services, Metro North Hospital and Health Service, Metro South Health, QIMR Berghofer Medical Research Institute, Queensland University of Technology, The University of Queensland and the Translational Research Institute.  

 International partnerships 
UQ is a partner of McDonnell International Scholars Academy - an international network of research universities and scholars comprising 28 university partners, including Boğaziçi University, Fudan University, Hong Kong University of Science and Technology, Indian Institute of Science, Indian Institute of Technology Bombay, Indian Institute of Technology Delhi, Keio University, Korea University, Makerere University, Middle East Technical University, National Taiwan University, National University of Singapore, National Yang Ming Chiao Tung University, Peking University, Reichman University, Seoul National University, State University of Campinas, Tata Institute of Social Sciences, Technion – Israel Institute of Technology, Tecnológico de Monterrey, The Chinese University of Hong Kong, Tsinghua University, University of Chile, University of Ghana, University of Hong Kong, University of Indonesia, University of Tokyo, Utrecht University and Yonsei University.

Commercialisation and entrepreneurship
UniQuest is the main commercialisation company of The University of Queensland and specialises in global technology transfer and facilitates access for all business. UniQuest has created over 100 startups from its intellectual property portfolio, and since 2000 UniQuest and its start-ups have raised more than $700 million to take university technologies to market. UQ technologies licensed by UniQuest include UQ's cervical cancer vaccine technology, image correction technology in magnetic resonance imaging machines, and the Triple P Positive Parenting Program.

Student life
The University of Queensland maintains a number of support and student services. The campuses at St Lucia and Gatton have Student Centres which provide information and support services.

UQ Union
The UQ Union is the peak student representation body that coordinates various student services and activities, including over 190 affiliated clubs and societies, some of whom are listed below.

 Semper Floreat''
 University of Queensland Australian Football Club
 University of Queensland Debating Society (UQDS)
 University of Queensland Football Club
 Queensland University Regiment
 University of Queensland Rugby Club

UQ Sport

UQ Sport offers a wide range of sport, fitness and recreation opportunities at the St Lucia and Gatton campuses of the University of Queensland. Its facilities and services are open to students, staff, alumni, and the general public.

The UQ Aquatic Centre is operated by UQ Sport and consists of three pools; 50-metre and 25-metre outdoor heated pools and a small enclosed heated teaching pool. The main pool is a 50m lap pool with a minimum of three lanes dedicated to public lap swimming throughout the opening hours.

The UQ Athletics Centre maintains an Olympic standard 8 lane synthetic track and grandstand able to accommodate up to 565 spectators. The UQ Sport and Fitness Centre is a multi-purpose indoor facility.

The UQ Tennis Centre is the largest tennis centre in both Brisbane and Queensland. The UQ Playing Fields and Ovals is also managed by UQ Sport, home to a total of eight oval fields at the St Lucia campus. The majority are designated for use by particular sports including cricket, rugby and soccer. These ovals are also used for recreational activities and lunchtime social sport.

Australia's largest university based sailing club, The University of Queensland Sailing Club, also operates under UQ Sport. However, the sailing club mainly operates off-site at a private facility in Redcliffe.

Events and traditions

Great Court Race

Inspired by the Trinity College Great Court Run of the University of Cambridge, the University of Queensland organises an annual 636m sprint race around the UQ sandstone Great Court.

Three Minute Thesis

In 2008, the university originated the Three Minute Thesis competition for students completing a higher degree by research. Three Minute Thesis is now held annually at universities across Australasia. It challenges participants to present their research in just 180 seconds, in an engaging form that can be understood by an intelligent audience with no background in the research area. This exercise develops presentation, research and academic communication skills and supports the development of research students' capacity to explain their work effectively.

Market Day
During Orientation week and the first week of each semester, Market Day is organised throughout Campbell Place and the Great Court at the St Lucia Campus. The UQ Union and clubs and societies have stalls and organises social activities. Several clubs also organize large displays. For example, the University of Queensland Sailing Club is known for placing a sailing boat in the Great Court.

Careers Fair
The UQ Careers Fair is an annual event that brings together university students and major employers from across the country. Degree-specific Careers Fairs are also held annually or bi-annually, such as the Engineering Careers Expo.

Residential colleges
The University of Queensland has 11 residential colleges with 10 of these located on its St Lucia campus and one on its Gatton campus. The University of Queensland Intercollege Council is the organisational and representative body for the residential colleges which coordinates sporting and cultural events and competitions.

 Cromwell College is a co-ed college founded in 1950. It is affiliated with the Uniting Church and accommodates 249 students.
 Duchesne College is a women's only college founded in 1937 in Toowong, moving the university in 1959. It is affiliated with the Society of the Sacred Heart and accommodates 210 students.
 Emmanuel College is a co-educational college founded in 1911. It accommodates 340 students.
 Gatton Halls of Residence was established in 1897 and has 440 residential students, making it by far the largest and oldest college at the University.
 Grace College is a women's college founded in 1970. It accommodates 181 students.
 International House is a co-educational college for International and Australian students founded in 1965.
 King's College provides accommodation for 320 male and female students of the University.
 St John's College is a co-educational college founded in 1911. It is administered by the Anglican Diocese of Brisbane.
 St Leo's College is a men's college affiliated with the Roman Catholic Archdiocese of Brisbane.
 Union College is a co-educational, secular college named after the student union. It is listed on the Queensland Heritage Register.
 Women's College is a college for female students.

Campuses and facilities

The University of Queensland maintains a number of campuses and facilities throughout Queensland. UQ has its main campus in the suburb of St Lucia in Brisbane, bordered by a meander in the Brisbane River to the north, east, and south. UQ's main campus has been recognised for its beauty by a number of sources. Its other campuses include Gatton and Herston.

St Lucia campus

In 1927, the land on which the St Lucia campus is built was resumed by the Brisbane City Council using money donated by James O'Neil Mayne and his sister Mary Emelia Mayne to replace the less spacious city campus. The city campus is now home to the Gardens Point campus of the Queensland University of Technology. Construction of the new university at St Lucia began in 1937.

Great Court

At its centre is the heritage-listed Great Court – a  open area surrounded by Helidon sandstone buildings with grotesques of great academics and historic scenes, floral and faunal motifs and crests of universities and colleges from around the world. This central semi-circular quadrangle features a connected arcade so students could reach any section under cover. The Great Court was added to the Queensland Heritage Register in 2002.

Museums

The University of Queensland Art Museum is located in the James and Mary Emelia Mayne Centre on the St Lucia campus. The Art Museum was established in the Forgan Smith Tower in 1976 to house the artworks collected by The University of Queensland since the 1940s, relocating to its present site in 2004. Today, with more than 4,400 artworks, the University's Art Collection is Queensland's second largest public art collection.

The university also houses the R.D. Milns Antiquities Museum in the Michie building (bldg 9, level 2) which contains Queensland's only publicly accessible collection of antiquities from ancient Rome, Greece, Egypt and the Near East. The museum supports research and teaching at the university. The UQ Anthropology Museum (also in the Michie Building on level 1) contains a significant collection of ethnographic material. It is also open to the public.

Gatton campus

The campus was opened in 1897 next to the site of the Queensland Agricultural College which was then amalgamated with UQ in 1990. UQ Gatton is the core campus for research, learning and teaching activities and facilities in agriculture, animals, veterinary science and the environment.

In 2008 the Centre for Advanced Animal Science (CAAS) was opened at the Gatton campus – a collaborative venture between UQ and the Queensland Government.

Herston campus

UQ Mayne Medical School and the Queensland Institute of Medical Research is the core campus for clinical health teaching and research. The campus is situated in Herston and operates within Queensland Health system of the Royal Brisbane Hospital, Royal Children's Hospital, Royal Women's Hospital and the Queensland Institute of Medical Research.

It is home to the Faculty of Medicine, the School of Population Health, the Herston Health Sciences Library, the Centre for Clinical Research and clinical research and learning activities of the School of Nursing and Midwifery. 
The Herston campus also houses other key facilities such as the Oral Health Centre and the purpose-built Herston Imaging Research Facility. The medical school building was added to the Queensland Heritage Register in 1999.

The Marks-Hirschfeld Museum of Medical History is in the Mayne Medical School at the Herston campus. Operated by volunteers and supported by The University of Queensland Alumni, it has a collection of over 7,000 items of medical memorabilia, medical and surgical instruments. The focus is on the study of medical history in Queensland, but the collection includes items with broader significance to Australia and internationally.

Overseas clinical schools
 Louisiana, United States – the UQ-Ochsner Clinical School operates at Ochsner Medical Center, New Orleans and Baton Rouge, allowing medical school students from the UQ-Ochsner program to receive two years of overseas clinical experience, contributing towards their UQ Doctor of Medicine (MD) degree.

Ipswich campus

In 2014, UQ sold the Ipswich Campus to the University of Southern Queensland, believing that this regional teaching campus would be better used by USQ.

Courses offered included: arts, business, medicine and social sciences as well as Interaction design. It is located near central Ipswich, Queensland, just south of the CBD. Nearby landmarks include Limestone Park, Workshops Rail Museum and RAAF Base Amberley.

The site dates back to 1878 with the opening of the Ipswich branch of the Woogaroo Lunatic Asylum. Operations continued until 1910 when it became the Ipswich Hospital for the Insane. In 1938 it was renamed the Ipswich Mental Hospital and in 1964 it was renamed again as the Ipswich Special Hospital. From 1968 to 1997 the Challinor Centre served as an institution for people with intellectual disabilities. In late 1997 the Challinor Centre began its first stage of transformation as the new UQ Ipswich campus.

Satellite teaching and research centres
UQ has other research and education facilities not directly attached to its three campuses. These locations are primarily for research, which cannot be undertaken in the campus locales but also represent buildings which established pre-eminence in education before the creation of the current campuses.

Queen Street
Queen Street, Brisbane is the location of the Customs House and the UQ Business School Downtown Venue. Customs House is one of Brisbane's heritage icons and is located on the river along Queen Street in the Brisbane central business district. It is leased to and operated by the University of Queensland as a cultural, educational and heritage facility. The UQ Business School Downtown is an inner-city corporate education, meeting and dining venue and facility which is on Level 19 of Central Plaza One in the Brisbane central business district.
Indooroopilly
Indooroopilly is the site of the Julius Kruttschnitt Mineral Research Centre and the Queensland University Regiment Logistics Company. The Julius Kruttschnitt Mineral Research Centre (JKMRC) of The University of Queensland Sustainable Minerals Institute is at a former silver and lead mine at Finney's Hill in Indooroopilly. Acquired in 1951 by the School of Mining Engineering under the leadership of Frank T. M. White, Foundation Professor (appointed 1950), this mine (formerly Finney's Hill United Silver Mines Limited) then became known as the Queensland University Experimental Mine. It promptly became an integral part of the teaching and research capacity of the School, which in 1952 expanded to become the Department of Mining and Metallurgical Engineering.

JKMRC, incorporating the Experimental Mine, was officially established as a University Centre in 1970, with a goal to develop practical technical solutions for large-scale mining and minerals industry challenges. It is named after Julius Kruttschnitt, the chairman of Mount Isa Mines and a board member of the university's Faculty of Engineering.

The Queensland University Regiment Logistics Company is housed in the Witton Barracks, Indooroopilly.

Other locations

 Pinjarra Hills – the Pinjarra Hills Research Station, the Veterinary Science Farm and the Pinjarra Aquatic Research Station are located in Pinjarra Hills, Brisbane. The Aquatic Research Station investigates aquaculture and inland ecology.
Its primary use is for coral reef ecology research and teaching and is an integral component of the Great Barrier Reef Ocean Observations System and the national Integrated Marine Observing System. It consists of more than 30 buildings on a two hectare lease.
 Moreton Bay – the Moreton Bay Research Station and Study Centre is in Dunwich on North Stradbroke Island and researches the ecosystems.
 Mt Nebo – The University of Queensland operates an International Seismograph Station on Mt Nebo.
 Charters Towers – The University of Queensland operates an International Seismograph Station at Charters Towers.
 Dayboro – the Dayboro Veterinary Surgery was bought by the university in 1987 as a teaching clinic for fifth year veterinary students in their dairy cattle medicine rotation. Later, separate brick accommodation was built for student accommodation. Research projects into practical aspects of dairy production are frequently carried out by clinic staff. There is a full range of veterinary services and pet care for dogs, cats, horses, cows, alpacas, goats, and all manner of other small and large animals.

Library

The University of Queensland Library was founded in 1910. It developed from a small provincial university library into a major research library.
It consists of 11 branches.

 Architecture and Music Library (ARMUS)
 Biological Sciences Library
 Central Library
 Dorothy Hill Engineering and Sciences Library (DHESL)
 Duhig Tower
 Fryer Library
 Gatton Library (J.K. Murray Library)
 Herston Health Sciences Library
 Pharmacy Australia Centre of Excellence Health Sciences Library (PACE)
 Rural Clinical School Library (RCS)
 Walter Harrison Law Library

Transport and other amenities

The university is served by the University of Queensland ferry wharf, the westernmost stop and terminus of the CityCat service. TransLink also operates two bus stations on campus: the University of Queensland bus station at Chancellor's Place in the west, connecting passengers to Brisbane's inner west suburbs such as Indooroopilly, Toowong and Milton; and the UQ Lakes busway station in the east, the western terminus of the Eastern Busway, with services to Brisbane's inner south suburbs such as Woolloongabba, Carindale and Mount Gravatt via the Eleanor Schonell Bridge. This bridge also allows pedestrians and cyclists to cross the Brisbane River, to reach Dutton Park. The closest stops of the Queensland Rail City network are the Toowong railway station, Park Road railway station, and Dutton Park railway station.

There are 3 refectories that provide food for students. These are the Main Refectory in the Student Union Complex, the Biological Sciences Refectory under the Biological Sciences Library, and the Physiology Refectory under the Physiology Lecture Theatres. The Student Union Complex houses the Student Union and other student services.

Publishing
University of Queensland Press publishes academic works, as well as, non-fiction works and has launched the careers of noted authors.

Academic journals
The university publishes several academic journals through its various schools and faculties and in association with publishers:
Australian Journal of Indigenous Education
Australian Journal of Politics and History
Crossroads: an Interdisciplinary Journal for the Study of History, Philosophy, Religion and Classics
Hecate Journal
LAWASIA Journal
npj Science of Learning (in partnership with Springer Nature)
Queensland Archaeological Research (1984–2011, now published by JCU)
Queensland Historical Atlas
TEMPUS: Archaeology and Material Culture Studies in Anthropology, monograph series.
The University of Queensland Law Journal

Notable alumni and faculty 

UQ has produced numerous distinguished alumni. Several notable examples include recipient of a Nobel Prize in Physiology and Medicine Peter C. Doherty, recipient of the "Triple Crown of Acting" (having won Primetime Emmy, Tony and Academy Awards) Geoffrey Rush, triple Grammy Award-winning musician Tim Munro, former Chief Justices of Australia Sir Gerard Brennan and Sir Harry Gibbs, international not-for-profit 'Hear and Say' founder and officer of the order of Australia Dimity Dornan, Principal of King's College London Edward Byrne, singer and eurovision representative Dami Im, former CEO of Dow Chemical Andrew Liveris, the first female Governor-General of Australia Dame Quentin Bryce, former Singaporean Minister of Defence and Manpower Lee Boon Yang, consecutive Olympic gold medal-winning swimmer David Theile, highly cited epidemiologist Graham Colditz, international best-selling author Kate Morton, and CEO of MS Research Australia and Harvard Club of Australia fellow Matthew Miles.

Controversies

Relationship with the Confucius Institute 

Apparent links with the Confucius Institute, a Chinese government-supported international education partnership program, have been controversial for UQ. The university offers 13 courses co-funded by the institute, mainly around Chinese arts, media and language. Critics of these courses have claimed Chinese government influence on the course content, while UQ has contested that they have been developed by university academics without external contribution.

Student suspensions

On 29 May 2020, the UQ disciplinary board issued a two-year suspension to activist Drew Pavlou for alleged bullying, discrimination and harassment of university students and staff. Pavlou has contested the reasoning describing in a statement released on Twitter that his suspension was "to silence [him] for [his] political activism", something denied by both the university, and the disciplinary and appeals boards. Pavlou has admitted to swearing at other students on Facebook and an online university forum. An appeal to the UQ Senate Disciplinary Appeals Committee resulted in the committee endorsing two counts of serious misconduct, however reducing the suspension from two years to one semester.

In June 2020, Pavlou launched a second lawsuit in the Supreme Court seeking 3.5 million in damages from the university for alleged defamation and a breach of contract. In September 2020, the Queensland Crime and Corruption Commission declined a request by Pavlou to investigate UQ Chancellor Peter Varghese and former Vice-Chancellor Peter Høj, citing that there was "insufficient evidence to suggest anyone who was subject of the complaint had engaged in corrupt conduct.

Sexual assaults 
Between 2011 and 2016 there were 38 reported cases of sexual assault and harassment on campus, resulting in 1 expulsion and 2 one-week suspensions. This included a report in 2015 where a staff member "filmed someone in the shower". These figures are lower than the 2017 Australian Human Rights Commission report on sexual assault and harassment. The vice-chancellor responded "there is no place for sexual assault or sexual harassment at UQ. Such behaviour is never the victim’s fault, and it will not be tolerated here" and introduced a number of new initiatives to address sexual assault problems.

Divestment
The University of Queensland's investment portfolio is a subject of ongoing debate. A fossil fuel divestment campaign began in 2013, led by the student group Fossil Free UQ and supported by the climate advocacy group 350.org. The goal of the campaign is "to freeze all new investments and phase out all current investments in coal, petroleum and gas over the next five years because fossil fuels drive climate change". 

On 18 April 2016, students occupied the Vice-Chancellory stating, 'We are asking the university to remove investment from the top 200 most polluting companies in the world' and calling for greater transparency regarding University investments. The sit-in resulted in communication with the Vice-Chancellor in May 2016.

In October 2016 Fossil Free QUT provided a report to the University Senate. For the period July 2015 to June 2016 direct fossil fuel companies comprised an average of 3.82% of UQ's $169.2m investment portfolio. The University Senate voted not to divest from fossil fuels citing, 'that divestment would make no real difference'.

In September 2013 350.org Australia released a report 'Exposing The Ties' to show 'shows how key decision makers at some of the country's leading tertiary institutions including the University of Queensland, University of Newcastle and University of New South Wales are non-executive directors or former employees of fossil fuel companies including AGL, BHP and Rio Tinto.' This showed The University of Queensland received $31million from the Australian Coal Association Research Program (ACARP) and the University's Senate includes three non-executive directors of Senex Energy, Metro Mining and Queensland Investment Corporation, (owner of Epic Energy and Lochard Energy) and a former Queensland Resources Council board member and recipient of the Queensland Resources Council Medal.

Seven of the 22 members of the senate for UQ have interests in the fossil fuel industry, having ties with fossil fuel companies previously or currently.

In October 2017 ten students occupied the Chancellor's Office deeming the 2016 Senate vote on divestment illegitimate due to conflicts of interest. The students were removed by the Queensland Police Service.

In 2020, when the Prime Minister Scott Morrison was visiting, many students protested at the university, damaging university's property and the prime minister's car. Some students came close to the prime minister and used a blowhorn with sirens.

See also

 AustLit, an Australian literature resource hosted by the School of Communication and Arts
 List of universities in Australia
 TC Beirne School of Law

References

Further reading

External links

 The University of Queensland
 The University of Queensland Press

 
Universities in Brisbane
Educational institutions established in 1909
Universities in Queensland
1909 establishments in Australia
Queensland in World War II
Queensland Greats
Schools in Queensland
Group of Eight (Australian universities)